Trepell Airport  is located at south-west of McKinlay, Queensland, Australia.  

The private airport is adjacent to 'South32 Cannington', Australia's largest single mine producer of both silver and lead.  Beside the airport and mine is a small housing set-up, that assists with fly-in fly-out (FIFO) workers.

See also

 List of airports in Queensland

References

Airports in Queensland